Shaun Taylor  (born 26 February 1963) is an English former professional footballer who made more than 500 appearances in the Football League and Premier League, playing for Exeter City, Swindon Town and Bristol City.

Playing career
Taylor was born in Plymouth. A hard-tackling no-nonsense defender, he played non-league football for clubs including Holsworthy FC, St Blazey and Bideford before moving to Exeter City in December 1986 at the age of 23. He captained Exeter to the Fourth Division championship in 1989–90, and played 200 league games for the club before moving to Swindon Town in July 1991 for a £200,000 fee. He was an ever-present as Swindon gained promotion to the Premier League in 1992–93, a season when he scored 13 goals including one in the play-off final, a high total for a defender, and played every game in their only season in the top flight. After a second relegation, he captained Swindon to the Second Division title, and became the first player to win the club's Player of the Year award three times. He played 259 games in all competitions for the club before joining Bristol City in September 1996 for £50,000.

After a further 105 league games for Bristol City, helping the club to promotion to Division One in 1998, Taylor retired as a player.

Coaching career
He joined the club's coaching staff at Bristol City. Released in May 2005, he moved to Conference National club Forest Green Rovers in June as assistant to manager Gary Owers; their contracts were terminated by mutual consent after a poor start to the 2006–07 season. In July 2009 Taylor rejoined Exeter City as youth coach. He then became Assistant manager at Exeter City's Devon rivals Torquay United until he was dismissed in May 2013.

Taylor's younger brother Craig was also a professional footballer.

On 12 July 2013, Shaun was appointed Professional Development Coach with his hometown club Plymouth Argyle youth academy.
In January 2018 Shaun Taylor returned to Torquay United as their new Head of Academy Coaching.

Honours
Individual
PFA Team of the Year: 1988–89 Fourth Division, 1989–90 Fourth Division, 1995–96 Second Division, 1997–98 Second Division

References

External links
 

1963 births
Living people
Footballers from Plymouth, Devon
English footballers
Association football defenders
St Blazey A.F.C. players
Exeter City F.C. players
Swindon Town F.C. players
Bristol City F.C. players
English Football League players
Premier League players
Bideford A.F.C. players
Bristol City F.C. non-playing staff
Forest Green Rovers F.C. non-playing staff
Exeter City F.C. non-playing staff
Torquay United F.C. non-playing staff
Plymouth Argyle F.C. non-playing staff
Association football coaches